Torysa may refer to:

Torysa (river), river in Slovakia
Torysa (village), village in Sabinov District, Slovakia